Fissuroma wallichiae is a fungus species of the genus of Fissuroma which was discovered in southern Thailand.

References

Fungi described in 2020